The 1995 U.S. Women's Open  was the 50th U.S. Women's Open, held July 13–16 at the East Course of Broadmoor Golf Club in Colorado Springs, Colorado.

Annika Sörenstam shot a final round 68 (−2) to win the first of her three U.S. Women's Opens, one stroke ahead of Meg Mallon, the 54-hole leader and 1991 champion.  Sörenstam started the final round at even-par 210, five strokes back in a tie for fourth place; the victory was the first of her ten major titles. The event was televised by ESPN and for the first time by NBC Sports.

Weather delays caused both of the first two rounds to be completed on the following day.

The low amateur was Sarah LeBrun Ingram at 294 (+14), who was seven months pregnant. Dawn Coe-Jones, six months pregnant, finished in a tie for seventh.

The 1995 edition was the first million dollar purse at the U.S. Women's Open, double that of 1990. It was only the fourth time the U.S. Women's Open was played in the western U.S. and the first ever in the Mountain Time Zone.

Cherry Hills Country Club, south of Denver, hosted in between in 2005.

Past champions in the field

Made the cut

Source:

Missed the cut

Source:

Round summaries

First round
Thursday, July 13, 1995
Friday, July 14, 1995

Source:

Second round
Friday, July 14, 1995
Saturday, July 15, 1995

Source:

Third round
Saturday, July 15, 1995

Source:

Final round
Sunday, July 16, 1995

Source:

References

External links
U.S. Women's Open - past champions - 1995

U.S. Women's Open
Golf in Colorado
Sports competitions in Colorado Springs, Colorado
U.S. Women's Open
U.S. Women's Open
U.S. Women's Open
U.S. Women's Open
1990s in Colorado Springs, Colorado
Women's sports in Colorado